The Keweenaw Underwater Preserve is a preservation area in the U.S. state of Michigan.  Located in Lake Superior, it protects waters that lie offshore Keweenaw Peninsula.

Keweenaw Point
The Michigan Department of Environmental Quality, which oversees the Keweenaw Underwater Preserve, calls the point of Keweenaw Peninsula a "catcher's mitt" for storm-beset Lake freighters and other boats in the southern half of Lake Superior.  Numerous wrecks, overseen as part of this preserve, can be seen here and are the object of recreational dives.  

One of the most recent large boats on the Great Lakes to be a total loss, the former United States Coast Guard cutter Mesquite, grounded off Keweenaw in 1989 and is now a diveable wreck in this preserve.

The largest wreck in the preserve is the freighter William C. Moreland which ran aground in 1910 and is a diveable, protected wreck resting in 40-feet of water.

References

External links
 Keweenaw Underwater Preserve Michigan Underwater Preserve Council

Protected areas of Keweenaw County, Michigan
Protected areas of Houghton County, Michigan
Marine parks of Michigan